This is a list of governors of the Austrian state of Burgenland:

Burgenland
Governors